The San Antonio River (Spanish, Río San Antonio, Portuguese, Rio Santo Antônio; also called San Antonio Guazú) is a tributary of the Iguazu River. The San Antonio River forms the border between Misiones Province in Argentina and Paraná State in Brazil. South of the San Antonio's source near Barracão, the international border continues south along the Pepiri-Guazu River, which forms the border between Misiones Province and Santa Catarina State.

See also
List of rivers of Argentina
List of rivers of Brazil

References

 Rand McNally, The New International Atlas, 1993.

Argentina–Brazil border
International rivers of South America
Rivers of Misiones Province
Rivers of Paraná (state)
Rivers of Argentina
Rivers of Santa Catarina (state)
Tributaries of the Paraná River
Border rivers